Ten Square Games (TSG, TEN) is a Polish mobile game developer, with headquarters in Wrocław and additional studios in Warsaw, Berlin, Bucharest and Verona. The company focuses on the production of hobby games in a free-to-play distribution model. Since 2011, it has released more than 200 games, including Let's Fish, Fishing Clash, Wild Hunt and Hunting Clash.

History 
The name refers to a 10-square-metre apartment, where the company was started in 2011. It was founded by Maciej Popowicz and Arkadiusz Pernal who had previously launched the nasza-klasa.pl social networking service.

In 2018 Ten Square Games went public and its shares started trading at the Warsaw Stock Exchange.  At the initial public offering, the company's capitalization was PLN 335 million. In June 2020 it rose to over PLN 4 billion which means that, given the USD/PLN exchange rate at that time, the company is worth more than US$1 billion.

As of June 2020, the company CEO is Maciej Zużałek, while both Maciej Popowicz and Arkadiusz Pernal have remained TSG team members. The company announced a new strategy which is focused on further organic development of its Wrocław hub, development of new studios in other locations, as well as mergers and acquisitions of other studios or teams, both in Poland and internationally. In March 2022, it was announced Ten Square Games had acquired a 24.8% stake in the Polish studio Gamesture for approximately $3.5 million.

The company currently employs over 320 people. Its games have more than 21 million active players.

In 2020 Ten Square Games saw net revenues of EUR 129 million (US$153 million), which means a growth rate of 140 per cent year-on-year.

Key games 
The company's first game to gain global prominence was Let's Fish, released in 2012 for desktop and in 2014 for mobile devices. The game allows the players to travel to more than 40 realistic places around the world, such as Rio Negro, Alaska, Fjords or Lake Baikal. They try to catch the biggest fish out of numerous species and compete with other players in various tournaments and world championships.

In 2017 the company released Fishing Clash, which has become its best-selling game. It is a combination of a fishing simulator, as well as outdoor and sports game. It allows players to travel to locations where they catch various species of fish and score points to become a ‘fish game king’. In 2020 the game generated EUR 126 million (US$149 million) of sales. It was ranked among TOP-40 highest-grossing games on Google Play. It is now the top 3–5. In 2021 Ten Square Games acquired the license to publish Fishing Clash in China.

Also in 2017 the company launched Wild Hunt, which is an action shooter game that allows players to travel to realistic hunting locations across all continents and hunt animals that inhibit those territories.

In 2020 the company launched Hunting Clash, which is a realistic hunting simulator. In 2021 the game entered the TOP-250 grossing games on Google Play in the US.

In 2020 the company's games bookings structure was based on North America (41.3%), Europe (39.3%), Asia (14.1%), and other markets (5.3%). As much as 96% of its sales was generated by the so-called micropayments (in app purchases) attesting itself as a pay to win .

In 2021 the company entered the mobile flight simulators market by acquiring RORTOS – an Italian games studio whose titles include Airline Commander, Real Flight Simulator and Extreme Landings.

References 

Video game companies of Poland
Mobile game companies
Video game companies established in 2011
Companies based in Wrocław
Polish companies established in 2011
Companies listed on the Warsaw Stock Exchange